The 2022 FIVB Volleyball Women's Challenger Cup was the third edition of the FIVB Volleyball Women's Challenger Cup, an annual women's international volleyball tournament contested by 8 national teams that acts as a qualifier for the FIVB Volleyball Women's Nations League. The tournament was held at Krešimir Ćosić Hall in Zadar, Croatia between 28 to 31 July 2022.

Croatia won the title, defeating Belgium in the final, and earned the right to participate in the 2023 Nations League replacing Belgium, the last placed challenger team in the 2022 edition. Puerto Rico defeated Colombia in the 3rd place match.

Qualification

Format
The tournament will compete in a knock-out phase (quarterfinals, semifinals, and final), with the host country (Croatia) playing its quarterfinal match against the lowest ranked team among the participating teams. The remaining seven teams are placed from 2nd to 8th positions as per the FIVB World Ranking as of 3 July 2022. Rankings are shown in brackets except the hosts.

Rule changes
 Court switch at the end of the sets to be eliminated due to COVID-19 safety guidelines and for a better television broadcasts.
 Each team is allowed to call only one time-out during each set in the preliminary. The time-out lasts 30 seconds long. During the finals, each team is granted one time-out before the technical and one time-out after the technical, except in a fifth set. 
 Only one technical time-out is made when the leading team reaches 12 points, but no technical in a fifth set.

Squads

Venue

Knockout stage
 All times are Central European Summer Time (UTC+02:00).

Quarterfinals
|}

Semifinals
|}

3rd place match
|}

Final
|}

Final standing

Source: VCC 2022 final standings

See also
2022 FIVB Volleyball Women's Nations League
2022 FIVB Volleyball Men's Challenger Cup
2022 FIVB Volleyball Men's Nations League

Notes
A.Cameroon withdrew and forfeit their match against Puerto Rico from the competition because they can't acquire entry visas to Croatia.

References

External links
Fédération Internationale de Volleyball – official website
2022 Challenger Cup – official website

FIVB Volleyball Women's Challenger Cup
FIVB
2022 in Croatian sport
International volleyball competitions hosted by Croatia
FIVB Volleyball Women's Challenger Cup
Sport in Zadar